Guru Somasundaram is an Indian actor who is Mainly working in Tamil and Malayalam movies. He made his debut in Aaranya Kaandam (2011) winning critical acclaim for his role, before also appearing in the Tamil action film Pandiya Naadu (2013),  Jigarthanda (2014) and Joker (2016). He rose to fame for playing the role of Shibu, a super villain  in the 2021 Netflix Malayalam film, Minnal Murali.

Early life
Guru Somasundaram was born on 3 September 1975. He has joined in the prominent Tamil theatre group in Koothu-P-Pattarai, where he enacted plays from 2002 till 2011. In 2003, director Thiagarajan Kumararaja met him, while he was playing the role of chandrahari in Koothupattarai's play, Thiagarajan has offered him an opportunity to the feature in the future film.

Career
In 2008, the director called up Somasundaram and offered him a role in his neo-noir film Aaranya Kaandam, for the character of the drunkard Kaalaiyan. Accepting the offer, Somasundaram lost seven kilograms and underwent rehearsals to change his hairstyle, moustache, walking styles, body language and mannerisms. Upon release in 2011, the film went on to gain two National Film Awards, while Somasundaram's performance was well received by critics. Rediff.com's critic praised the ensemble cast but added "the honours undoubtedly go to Guru Somasundaram. His gleeful cackles at the rooster fight, pathetic rumblings to his son and wide-eyed act in the Lodge are wonderful to behold." Similarly Behindwoods.com noted that the actor had delivered a "superior" performance. After seeing his performance, director Mani Ratnam signed him on to play a small role in Kadal (2013).

After leaving Koothu-P-Pattarai, he toured as a freelance theatre actor, before venturing into Malayalam cinema by portraying a photographer in 5 Sundarikal (2013), after being impressed by Shyju Khaled's narration. Later that year, he was seen in a character role in Suseenthiran's critically acclaimed Pandiya Naadu, portraying the slain brother of Vishal's character. In between feature films, he appeared in the short silent film The Lost Paradise, portraying a prisoner heading home after fifteen years. He also won acclaim for his performance as an acting coach in Karthik Subbaraj's gangster film Jigarthanda (2014), where he was seen giving acting training to the character portrayed by Bobby Simha. Somasundaram had previously trained Simha as an actor in real life during the pair's theatre performances. He is also known for his role as a district collector in the 2019 Tamil film Petta which starred Rajinikanth in the lead role.

Filmography

Films

Short films

 (2016) - Oru Poi

 (2017) - Irudhi Aram

Web series

Awards and nominations

References

Basil Joseph - Guru Somasundaram to star in Namitha Pramod's upcoming film ‘KAPP’ 
https://timesofindia.indiatimes.com/entertainment/malayalam/movies/news/basil-joseph-guru-somasundaram-to-star-in-namitha-pramods-upcoming-film-kapp/articleshow/89296131.cms

External links

Guru Somasundaram on Moviebuff

Male actors from Chennai
Indian male film actors
Tamil male actors
Living people
Male actors in Tamil cinema
Male actors in Malayalam cinema
Tamil comedians
Indian male comedians
21st-century Indian male actors
1975 births